Majestic Theatre or Majestic Theater may refer to:

Australia
 Majestic Theatre, Adelaide, former name of a theatre in King William Street, Adelaide, built 1916, now demolished
Majestic Theatre, Launceston, a former cinema in Tasmania designed by Greek-Australian businessman Marino Lucas 
Majestic Theatre, Pomona, a heritage-listed silent movie theatre in Queensland
Majestic Picture Theatre, Malanda, a heritage-listed movie theatre in Queensland

Singapore
The Majestic, Singapore, a historic building and former theatre in Chinatown, Singapore

United States of America
CIBC Theatre, Chicago, Illinois, opened in 1906 as the Majestic Theatre
Cutler Majestic Theatre, Boston, Massachusetts, a 1903 Beaux Arts-style performing arts center at Emerson College
Majestic Theatre (Bridgeport, Connecticut), 1922
Majestic Theatre (Broadway), New York City, a 1927 theatre known as a venue for major musical theatre productions
Majestic Theatre (Columbus Circle), New York City, a 1903 building, demolished in 1954
Majestic Theatre (Dallas), Texas, a 1920 performing arts theater in the City Center District, listed on the NRHP
Majestic Theatre (Detroit), a 1915 theatre in Michigan listed on the NRHP
Majestic Theatre (East St. Louis), listed on the NRHP in St. Clair County, Illinois
Majestic Theatre (Los Angeles), now demolished
Majestic Theatre (Madison), a historic landmark
Majestic Theatre, Providence, Rhode Island, now known as Trinity Repertory Company
Majestic Theatre (San Antonio), Texas, a 1929 building listed on the NRHP

See also
Majestic (disambiguation)